Louisette Dussault (12 June 1940 – 14 March 2023) was a Canadian actress and writer from Quebec.

Life and career
Louisette Dussault was born in Thetford Mines and studied at the National Theatre School of Canada. With Jean-Claude Germain, she founded Les Enfants de Chénier and took part in their show Grand Spectacle d'adieu. She performed in works by André Brassard and Michel Tremblay, including the film Françoise Durocher, Waitress, first readings of Les Belles-Soeurs,  and Tremblay's translations of Lysistrata and Dario Fo's Mistero Buffo. She appeared in the important feminist works La Nef des sorcières and Les Fées ont soif, as well as in her own monologue Moman. This last work was translated into English as Mommy and was included in the collection Anthology of Quebec Women's Plays in English Translation Vol I (1966–1986) (2006). Dussault wrote and performed in the play Pandora ou Mon p'tit papa. She appeared in the title role in the award-winning play Le voyage magnifique d'Emily Carr.

Dussault also performed on television and in film. From 1964 to 1971, she performed in the title role of the children's television series .

Dussault died on 14 March 2023, at the age of 82.

References

External links 
 

1940 births
2023 deaths
Actresses from Quebec
Canadian stage actresses
Canadian television actresses
Canadian film actresses
20th-century Canadian actresses
21st-century Canadian actresses
Canadian women dramatists and playwrights
Canadian dramatists and playwrights in French
20th-century Canadian dramatists and playwrights
20th-century Canadian women writers
Writers from Quebec
People from Thetford Mines
French Quebecers
National Theatre School of Canada alumni